The southern white rhinoceros or southern white rhino (Ceratotherium simum simum) is one of the two subspecies of the white rhinoceros (the other being the much rarer northern white rhinoceros). It is the most common and widespread subspecies of rhinoceros.

Taxonomic and evolutionary history
The southern white rhinoceros is the nominate subspecies; it was given the scientific name Ceratotherium simum simum by the English explorer William John Burchell in the 1810s. The subspecies is also known as Burchell's rhinoceros (Ceratotherium simum burchellii) after Burchell and Oswell's rhinoceros (Ceratotherium simum oswellii) after William Cotton Oswell, respectively. However, these are considered synonyms of its original scientific name.

Ceratotherium simum kiaboaba (or Rhinoceros kiaboaba), also known as straight-horned rhinoceros, was proposed as a different subspecies (or species) found near Lake Ngami and north of the Kalahari desert. However, it is now considered part of the southern white rhinoceros.

Following the phylogenetic species concept, research in 2010 suggested the southern and northern white rhinoceros may be different species, rather than subspecies, in which case the correct scientific name for the northern subspecies is Ceratotherium cottoni and the southern subspecies should be known as simply Ceratotherium simum. Distinct morphological and genetic differences suggest the two proposed species have been separated for at least a million years.

Physical descriptions

The southern white rhinoceros is one of largest and heaviest land animals in the world. It has an immense body and large head, a short neck and broad chest. It has two horns on its snout. The front horn is larger than the other horn and averages  in length and can reach . Females usually have longer but thinner horns than the males, who have larger but shorter ones. The southern white rhinoceros also has a prominent muscular hump that supports its large head. The colour of this animal can range from yellowish brown to slate grey. Most of its body hair is found on the ear fringes and tail bristles, with the rest distributed sparsely over the rest of the body. The southern white rhino has a distinctive flat, broad mouth that is used for grazing.Southern white rhinos are strictly herbivores (graminivores) that feed on short grasses.

Mating and reproduction
Little is known about Southern White Rhinoceros mating habits,but females reproduce every 2-3 years.They give birth to a single calf after the gestation period that lasts around 16 months. Newborn calves weigh about 45 kg (100 pounds) at birth. Young usually become independent in 2-3 years.
.

Habitat and distribution

The southern white rhino lives in the grasslands, savannahs, and shrublands of southern Africa, ranging from South Africa to Zambia. About 98.5% of southern white rhino live in just five countries: South Africa, Namibia, Zimbabwe, Kenya and Uganda.

Population and threats

The southern white rhino is listed as Near Threatened; it is mostly threatened by habitat loss and poaching for rhino horn for use in traditional Chinese medicine.

The southern white rhino was nearly extinct near the end of the 19th century having been reduced to a population of approximately 20–50 animals in KwaZulu-Natal due to sport hunting and land clearance. Numbers increased rapidly from 1992-2010, due to intensive protection and translocation efforts, however population growth then slowed as poaching increased, with numbers declining from 2012-2017. An approximate 15% decline in estimated numbers between 2012–2017 was primarily due to reductions in populations within South Africa’s Kruger National Park. Poaching rates peaked in 2014 and as of December 2017, there were an estimated 18,064 southern white rhino in the wild with populations being assessed as Near Threatened since 2002.

White rhino trophy hunting was legalized and regulated in 1968, and after initial miscalculations is now generally seen to have assisted in the species' recovery by providing incentives for landowners to boost rhino populations.

Conservation status
The subspecies is protected under the Convention on International Trade in Endangered Species (CITES) meaning international import/export (including in parts/derivatives) is regulated by the CITES permit system. Populations of South Africa, Eswatini and Namibia are listed in CITES Appendix II with strict conditions while all other populations are listed in CITES Appendix I.

Introduction/reintroduction projects

There are smaller reintroduced populations within the historical range of the southern white rhinoceros in Namibia, Botswana, Zimbabwe, Eswatini, Zambia and in southwestern Democratic Republic of the Congo, while a small population survives in Mozambique. Populations have also been introduced outside of the former range of the species to Kenya, Uganda and Zambia, where their northernmost relatives used to occur. The southern white rhinoceros have been reintroduced in the Ziwa Rhino Sanctuary in Uganda, and in the Lake Nakuru National Park and the Kigio Wildlife Conservancy in Kenya.

In 2010, nine southern white rhinoceros were imported from South Africa and shipped to the Yunnan province from southeast China where they were kept in an animal wildlife park for acclimation. In March 2013, seven of the animals were shipped to the Laiyanghe National Forest Park, a habitat where Sumatran and Javan rhinoceros once lived. Two of the southern white rhinos began the process of being released into the wild on May 13, 2014.

In captivity
Wild-caught southern white rhinoceros will readily breed in captivity given appropriate amounts of space and food, as well as the presence of other female rhinos of breeding age. Many rhinoceros living in zoos today are a part of a cooperative breeding program to increase population numbers and maintain genetic diversity without pulling individuals from the wild. For instance, 96 calves have been born at the San Diego Zoo Safari Park since 1972. However, the rate of reproduction is fairly low among captive-born southern white females, potentially due to their diet. Ongoing research through San Diego Zoo Global is hoping to not only focus on this, but also on identifying other captive species that are possibly affected and developing new diets and feeding practices aimed at enhancing fertility. When managed correctly the rate of natural reproduction among captive-born southern white females is relatively good as can be seen by the success of John Frederik Hume's rhino breeding initiative, which currently has an average of 200 natural births per year and has seen more than 1800 natural births since 1993. In South Africa a population of southern white rhinos are being raised on farms and ranches for their horns along with the black rhino.

References

Notes

External links

Rhinoceroses
Mammals described in 1817
Mammals of South Africa
Mammals of Zimbabwe
Mammals of Botswana
Mammals of Namibia
Mammals of Zambia